The under secretary of defense for intelligence and security or USD(I&S) is a high-ranking civilian position in the Office of the Secretary of Defense (OSD) within the U.S. Department of Defense (DoD) that acts as the principal civilian advisor and deputy to the secretary of defense (SecDef) and deputy secretary of defense (DepSecDef) on matters relating to military intelligence and security. The under secretary is appointed as a civilian by the president and confirmed by the Senate to serve at the pleasure of the president.

In 2019, Congress renamed the office from Under Secretary of Defense for Intelligence (USD(I)) to Under Secretary of Defense for Intelligence and Security as part of the FY2020 National Defense Authorization Act.

Overview 
The Office of the Under Secretary of Defense for Intelligence and Security (OUSD(I&S)) is the principal staff element of the DoD for all matters regarding intelligence, counterintelligence, security, sensitive activities, and other intelligence- and security-related matters. As the SecDef's representative, the USD(I&S) exercises oversight over, among others, the Defense Intelligence Agency (DIA), the National Geospatial-Intelligence Agency (NGA), the National Reconnaissance Office (NRO), the National Security Agency (NSA), and the Defense Counterintelligence and Security Agency (DCSA). In addition, the under secretary is also dual-hatted, serving as the Director of Defense Intelligence (DDI) under the Office of the Director of National Intelligence (ODNI); in this capacity, the under secretary is the principal defense intelligence and security advisor to the Director of National Intelligence (DNI). With the rank of under secretary, the USD(I&S) is a Defense Intelligence Senior Executive Service (DISES) Level III position within the Executive Schedule. Since January 2020, the annual rate of pay for Level III is $181,500.

History 
The position of Under Secretary of Defense for Intelligence was originally created by the National Defense Authorization Act for Fiscal Year 2003 in the aftermath of the September 11 terror attacks to better coordinate Department-wide intelligence and security activities. It also became second in the line of succession for the secretary of defense, after the deputy secretary of defense, following an executive order by President George W. Bush on 22 December 2005. When it was created, the legislation described it as taking precedence in the Department behind the under secretary for personnel and readiness (USD (P&R)).

On 23 November 2005, a DoD directive was made by SecDef Donald Rumsfeld that stated that the under secretary shall serve as the secretary's primary representative to the ODNI. It also stated the under secretary shall provide policy and oversight on the training and career development of personnel in the DoD's counterterrorism, intelligence, and security components. The under secretary has the duty of finding candidates to be nominated to serve as directors of the DIA, NGA, NRO, NSA, and DCSA, and directly overseeing their performance.

The additional position of the USD(I&S) acting in the capacity of Director of Defense Intelligence as the primary military intelligence and security advisor to the DNI follows a May 2007 memorandum of agreement between SecDef Robert Gates and DNI John Michael McConnell to create the position. In 2006, the incoming Gates eschewed the idea of "off-line intelligence organizations or analytical groups".

Reporting officials 
Officials reporting to the USD(I&S) include:

Directors for Defense Intelligence (DDI):
Director for Defense Intelligence (Warfighter Support)
Director for Defense Intelligence (Counterintelligence, Law Enforcement and Security)
Director for Defense Intelligence (Collection and Special Programs)
Director for Defense Intelligence (Intelligence and Security Programs and Resources)

Others:
Director of the DIA
Director of the NGA
Director of the NSA / Central Security Service
Director of the NRO
Director of the DCSA

Office of the Under Secretary 

The under secretary heads the Office of the Under Secretary of Defense for Intelligence and Security (OUSD(I&S)). A unit of the OSD, OUSD(I&S) exercises planning, policy, and strategic oversight over all DoD intelligence, counterintelligence, and security matters. OUSD(I&S) serves as the primary representative of the Defense Department to the DNI and other members of the United States Intelligence Community.

The work of OUSD(I&S) is conducted through its several staff directorates, including:
Under the direction of the deputy under secretary for joint coalition warfighter support
Information Operations (IO) and Strategic Studies Directorate – Advisor for DoD Cyber, IO integration and IO-enabling strategic activities
Warfighter Requirements and Evaluation Directorate – Provides guidance and oversight to sustain the Intelligence Planning process to synchronize and integrate national and Defense Intelligence Enterprise efforts in support of selected combatant command top priority contingency and campaign plans
Policy, Strategy, and Doctrine Directorate – Provides oversight, development, and management of Defense Intelligence, Counterintelligence, security and intelligence-related policy, strategy, and doctrine, and establishes priorities to ensure conformance with SecDef and DNI guidance
Information Sharing and Partner Engagement Directorate – Coordinates all intelligence information sharing and related Warfighter intelligence support issues for the under secretary
Intelligence, Surveillance and Reconnaissance (ISR) Directorate – Responsible for operationalizing approved ISR initiatives. Provides ISR capability with supporting infrastructure for collection, communications and processing, exploitation and dissemination in support of commands engaged in combat operations
Under the direction of the deputy under secretary of defense for technical collection and analysis
Analytic Concepts and Strategies Directorate – Stimulates, develops and implements advanced concepts, responsive strategies, and cutting-edge analytic tradecraft methodologies, techniques and procedures that focus on improving the full spectrum of analysis and maximizing the integration and collaboration between technical analysis and all-source analysis
Collection Concepts and Strategies Directorate – Stimulates, develops and implements advanced concepts, responsive strategies, and cutting-edge integration methodologies, techniques and procedures
Special Capabilities Directorate – Develops, oversees, and manages special activities addressing critical intelligence needs, operational shortfalls, and interagency requirements
Under the direction of the deputy under secretary of defense for portfolio, programs and resources
Battlespace Awareness (BA) Portfolio Directorate – Serves as the principal staff advisor and functional manager for the Department's BA Portfolio
Intelligence, Surveillance and Reconnaissance Programs Directorate – Provides functional oversight for DoD ISR programs, to include processing, exploitation, and dedicated communications networks
Military Intelligence Program Resources Directorate – Develops investment strategies addressing Warfighter near-term and long-term ISR and other intelligence-related needs
Under the direction of the deputy under secretary of defense for HUMINT, counterintelligence and security
Counterintelligence Directorate – Staff advisor for Department Counterintelligence and Credibility Assessment matters
HUMINT Directorate – Staff advisor for Department HUMINT, overseeing the full spectrum of Department HUMINT plans, programs, and operations, to include Identity Intelligence biometrics
Security Directorate – Staff advisor for Department security policy, planning, and oversight, and Executive Agent for the National Industrial Security Program
Sensitive Activities Directorate – Staff office concerning Department Sensitive Activities, National programs, Defense Sensitive Support and sensitive Special Operations
Direct Report Offices – Central administrative activity of the OUSD-I for legislative affairs, human capital, management, and policy oversight

Budget

Budget totals 
The annual budget for the USD(I&S) is contained in the Office of the Secretary of Defense's (OSD) budget, under the Defense-Wide Operation and Maintenance (O&M) account.

Budget features 
Intelligence Mission – Provides funding for the four Deputy Under Secretaries of the OUSD(I&S) as well as four direct reporting agencies:
DUSD Joint and Coalition Warfighter Support (J&CWS) – Ensures that intelligence support across the Department meets critical and timely Warfighter needs and requirements through policy development, planning, and operational oversight
DUSD Technical Collection and Analysis (TC&A) – Provides direction and oversight of all DoD intelligence analytical and technical collection functions
DUSD Portfolio, Programs and Resources (PP&R) – Develops Defense Department investment strategy for Intelligence, Surveillance, and Reconnaissance (ISR) and Environmental system capabilities
DUSD HUMINT, Counterintelligence and Security (HCI&S) – Responsible for developing policy and exercise planning, and strategic oversight for the DoD in the areas of HUMINT, Counterintelligence (CI), security and sensitive activities
International Intelligence Technology – Develops, coordinates, oversees, and manages OUSD(I&S)'s technology and architectural analysis and support to allied and coalition intelligence sharing and exchange requirements. Conducts research, analysis, and coordination to advance and integrate DoD, NATO, and coalition intelligence sharing, exploitation, and dissemination
Defense Civilian Intelligence Personnel System (DCIPS) – DCIPS implementation enables Defense Department intelligence agencies to more effectively establish positions and appoint, pay, develop, retain, and motivate a world-class workforce committed to providing effective intelligence support to the Warfighter and the national policy maker
Joint Military Deception Initiative – Funds an initiative to revitalize Defense Department military deception planning and execution capability in the Unified Combatant Commands
Travel – Funds employee travel in support of OUSD(I&S) missions

Office holders

References 

Directors of the United States intelligence agencies